Janne Mortil (born December 14, 1967) is a Vancouver-based Canadian-American actress probably best known for playing Madeleine Astor in Titanic (1996) and Michelle Dupont in the television series Side Effects, for which she was nominated for a Gemini, and Detective Tricia Kelsey in Street Justice (1991–1993).

Career

Janne Mortil began her career with a 1973 appearance in The Beachcombers at the age of five. She was a regular in the 1970s soap opera House of Pride. She performed on stage in the 1979 Vancouver Playhouse Theatre Company's production of The Innocents and appeared in 1980 in Huckleberry Finn and His Friends television series. 

Her movie roles include Sally Moffat in Little Women (1994). In 1996, she played Madeleine Astor in the television movie Titanic, opposite Catherine Zeta-Jones. In 2003, she played Sergeant Kibble in Hitcher 2.

Her television credits include 21 Jump Street, The X-Files, Poltergeist: The Legacy and Cold Squad. In 1992 she provided narration for the CBC documentary mini-series The Valour and the Horror. She played also Detective Tricia Kelsey on Street Justice (1991-1992) and Michelle Dupont, the clinic's receptionist in Side Effects (1994-1996). For the latter role, she was nominated for a 1996 Gemini Award for Best Performance by an Actress in a Supporting Role in a Dramatic Series.

Personal life
Mortil lived in Montreal with Tony Nardi, her former partner, since 1995.

Filmography

Film

Television

Awards and nominations

References

External links

Living people
Canadian television actresses
1967 births